Anastasiia Veresova (born 3 November 1999) is a Ukrainian acrobatic gymnast. With partner Ella Bogdanova, Veresova achieved 6th in the 2014 Acrobatic Gymnastics World Championships.

References

1999 births
Living people
Ukrainian acrobatic gymnasts
Female acrobatic gymnasts
Place of birth missing (living people)